Kestrel (John Wraith) is a character appearing in American comic books published by Marvel Comics.

The character appeared in the 2009 film X-Men Origins: Wolverine, portrayed by Will.i.am.

Publication history
Kestrel first appeared in Wolverine vol. 2 60 and was created by Larry Hama.

Fictional character biography
John Wraith was a member of Team X and later a test subject of the Weapon X Program. He was part of Team X along with Wolverine, Sabretooth, Maverick, Mastodon and Silver Fox. John was a powerful teleporter, capable of getting the team out of sticky situations after their job was finished. He had a penchant for explosives, arming himself with shaped charges, explosives that were built to direct the force of their blast in specific directions based on how they are deployed. Like the other members of Team X, he was given an artificial age suppressant so he was likely much older than he looked. His time as a secret agent and a member of the Weapon X program left John somewhat paranoid. His house was a veritable death trap, as was the yard around it; John trusted no one.

John made it a habit to keep his ability a secret from everyone, even his companions. He only ever used it sparingly, when no one was looking at him unless it was vital. The only time when his fellow Team-X members found out about his powers was when they went up against Omega Red. John was backup on that mission that Wolverine, Maverick, and Sabretooth ran in Germany to collect a carbonadium synthesizer, and when that trio burst out of the target compound with Red in pursuit, John stalled him with his gun until the others got away. Unfazed, Omega went to wrap John up and tear him to pieces, but John teleported to safety at the last second, with only Wolverine and Omega Red seeing this. There was also a certain animosity between him and Sabretooth. He was about as violent as his fellows from the Weapon X program, but a lot more merciful and didn't enjoy killing innocents while on a mission, which put him at odds with people like Sabretooth. Sabretooth once languished for quite a time in John's basement with several shaped charges strapped to his chest. Unless he had a really good reason to, Sabretooth wouldn't lift a finger to help John.

Years later, John had tracked Wolverine and the rest of his old teammates down because it seemed that there was a problem with the age suppression factors given to them by Weapon X, as one of their number, Mastodon, had suddenly aged quite rapidly and been reduced into a pile of ooze. With their help, John discovered a list of termination candidates from the Weapon X project. They uncovered themselves on the list plus a man named Aldo Ferro, who they knew was a big time mafia chief, Il Topo Siciliano. They tracked Ferro to his secluded island where they discovered Maverick guarding him. After Ferro's transformation caused Carol Hines to die of fright, Maverick soon changed sides when Ferro reveals that he had used his psi-powers to speed the false memory implantation of the Weapon X subjects. After this fiasco, John hung out with Wolverine for a month or two, but then vanished.

Wraith was later re-recruited into Weapon X by the "Director" and his mission was to recruit Maverick as well. However, Maverick fought back and Wraith was shot and then had his neck broken by Sabretooth, who was planning on betraying the Program and couldn't trust Wraith. He was left for dead, but managed to survive.

John Wraith turns up alive and later became a preacher and was visited by Wolverine who confided in Wraith during soul-searching instigated by his being somewhat skeptical of his new start in life. However, a demon later possessed Wolverine's body (referred to as Hellverine) and lured Wraith into a trap by killing one of his parishioners. Whilst exiting the chapel and locking the parishioners inside so as to ensure they would not come to any more harm, Wraith armed himself with an assault rifle and set off to stop Logan's rampage only to be caught in one of his own traps, where he came face to face with Hellverine who managed to cast a spell of sorts on him, causing an assortment of deadly creatures to crawl all over his body; seemingly killing him. Hellverine then directed its attention to Wraith's church (which was still locked with the parishioners inside) and used its demonic powers to set the building ablaze. Wraith emerged from nowhere and tried in vain to stop the demon, but was critically wounded by its claws. Helpless, Wraith could only watch as the parishioners were burned alive as he lay dying, as he was now depowered and could no longer teleport.

Powers and abilities
Wraith had the psionic ability to phase-jump; meaning he could seemingly disappear at will from any point in space and appear at another, with what would appear to be an exceptionally-high range. He could move about space at will, appearing and disappearing in a fashion that left no flashy burst of light or sound and he could even take others with him. He also had a life-extending serum in his blood, due to his involvement in the Weapon X program. He liked using "shaped charges," bombs whose blasts are precisely controlled.

Other versions

Ultimate Marvel

The Ultimate Marvel version of the character is a Caucasian male. Colonel John Wraith was a mutant-hating commando who was in charge of the world's first mutant concentration camp. He was sanctioned by S.H.I.E.L.D. to head the barbaric Weapon X Program, which specialized in capturing mutants and forcing them to carry out covert missions for the US government. The program was co-headed by a Dr. Abraham Cornelius. He and his men (all who have anti-mutant sentiments as well) managed to capture and subject Canadian para-trooper James "Lucky Jim" Howlett to experiments which wiped his memories clean and bonded his skeleton with Adamantium. They christened Howlett Weapon X and gave the fake name Logan. Wraith and his men enjoyed tormenting Logan by teasing with bits and pieces of lost memories and also caging and shooting Logan day and night since Logan could not die due to his own mutant healing factor. This conditioned Logan to become the perfect killing machine, or so they thought.

During the Gulf War, they were transporting Logan in the desert, preparing for deployment, but the transport team was ambushed and Logan was accidentally set loose. Stumbling across a younger Nick Fury taken by surprise by the same ambush, Logan rescued and brought Fury back to base camp. Colonel Wraith, surprised that Logan retained his humanity by not killing Fury, ordered his men to shoot and cage Logan once again. He told Fury not to worry about Logan since he was nothing more than a living weapon. A couple of years later, Fury returned the favor by helping Logan escape from the Weapon X facility.

Wraith sent Sabretooth, another one of his mutant agents, after Logan but came back empty-handed. Wraith then began capturing other mutants to take Logan's place, mutants including Nightcrawler, Rogue and Cain Marko. When he received news that Logan headed back to America (as an assassin for Magneto unknown to them), he and his men again attempted to recapture Logan, only to have their plans foiled by the X-Men. Wraith's face was scarred by Logan's claws. In retribution, Wraith ordered the capture of the X-Men, but again he failed to catch Logan.

He had Charles Xavier hooked up to machines to harness the Professor's telepathy to help find other potential candidates for the program. The mutants imprisoned at the Weapon X facility were tortured on a daily basis; Rogue's arm was broken regularly and molten metal was poured on Colossus to test durability. It was also during this time that Beast gets mutated even further by Dr. Cornelius. To keep them in line, Wraith had implanted micro explosives into them and if anyone got out of line or tried to escape, it was their friends who would pay the price.

The X-Men's first major mission forced them to split up. One team was assigned to free Nick Fury having been captured by a foreign country, while the other team was assigned to destroy a new bio-weapon being developed by terrorists. Jean Grey was ordered to execute one of the scientists they had captured but refused. Wraith threatened to detonate Cyclops's implants for insubordination, at which point Jean is forced to kill someone for the very first time.

When General Ross threatened to phase out Weapon X, Wraith used Xavier to dispose of the General with a mental explosion. Wolverine eventually gets captured, but had secretly led the Brotherhood to the facility in an attempt of freeing the imprisoned mutants. When the mutants began to break free, Wraith shot Xavier and attempted to flee in a helicopter. The Blob held onto Wraith's helicopter, but eventually loses grip. Storm tried to zap Wraith with lightning, but Nightcrawler saved the Colonel who in turn tried to kill Nightcrawler. Fury killed Wraith and declared that all the mutants at the facility were free to go.

Canadian government forces saved Wraith's life by injecting him with the Banshee drug, and he was made leader of Alpha Flight. He also gained superpowers. Wraith decided to call himself "Vindicator". His team went to retrieve Northstar, which led the X-Men to find out that Wraith's team all use Banshee. After the Ultimatum wave, Rogue sought out Wraith after finding out his identity during a previous battle when some of the X-Men went to rescue Northstar. Rogue convinced him to help kill Magneto. He needed a few more people to help with this mission, so he and Rogue captured Sabretooth and Juggernaut to reform Weapon X. Wraith was later killed by Stryker after blasting a hole in his armor.

In other media

Television
A character based on the Ultimate Marvel incarnation of John Wraith named Colonel Moss appears in Wolverine and the X-Men, voiced by Michael Ironside. This version is the head of the Mutant Response Division and former head of Weapon X under Professor Thorton and Abraham Cornelius who bears a vendetta against Wolverine, who slashed his face sometime prior to the series. In a possible post-apocalyptic future controlled by the Sentinels, Moss sided with them and became a cyborg in charge of placing mutants in concentration camps.

Film
John Wraith appears in X-Men Origins: Wolverine, portrayed by Will.i.am. This version is a member of William Stryker's Team X and the only member of the group who Logan trusts. Initially loyal to the group, Wraith and Logan eventually quit over moral issues, with the former going on to become a boxing manager and helping to get teammate Frederick Dukes back into shape. Years later, Wraith accompanies Logan in seeking out Stryker, only to be confronted by Victor Creed, who eventually kills Wraith for use in Stryker's experiments.

Video games
 John Wraith appears in the X-Men Origins: Wolverine tie-in game, voiced by Will.i.am. This version was imprisoned by Project: WideAwake before he is rescued by Logan and Raven Darkholme.
 An unrelated Kestrel named Major Sybil Tan appears in Marvel Strike Force. This version is a S.H.I.E.L.D. researcher.

References

Fictional soldiers
Comics characters introduced in 1991
Fictional African-American people
Fictional characters with slowed ageing
Fictional colonels
Fictional American secret agents
Marvel Comics characters who can teleport
Marvel Comics film characters
Marvel Comics male supervillains
Marvel Comics mutants
Marvel Comics superheroes
Marvel Comics supervillains
Characters created by Larry Hama
Fictional priests and priestesses
S.H.I.E.L.D. agents
Fictional characters with memory disorders
X-Men supporting characters